The 4th constituency of the Savoie (French: Quatrième circonscription de la Savoie) is a French legislative constituency in the Savoie département. Like the other 576 French constituencies, it elects one MP using a two round electoral system.

Description

The 4th constituency of Savoie was created in 2012 as a result of the 2010 redistricting of French legislative constituencies. The consists of Chambéry and some of its immediate hinterland in the north east of the department.

The constituency initially elected a Socialist Party deputy but she failed to win re-election in the face of Emmanuel Macron's centrist coalition in 2017.

Assembly Members

Election results

2022

 
 
|-
| colspan="8" bgcolor="#E9E9E9"|
|-

2017

 
 
 
 
 
 
 
 
|-
| colspan="8" bgcolor="#E9E9E9"|
|-

2012

 
 
 
 
 
|-
| colspan="8" bgcolor="#E9E9E9"|
|-

References

4